Kirino may refer to:

Quirino, a province in the Philippines, also known as Kirino
Kirino Toshiaki (1838–1877), a Japanese samurai and an Imperial Japanese Army general
Natsuo Kirino (born 1951), a Japanese novelist
 Kirino Chiba, a character from Bamboo Blade
 Ranmaru Kirino, a character from Inazuma Eleven GO
 Kirino Kosaka, a character from Oreimo

See also
Kirin (disambiguation)
Quirino (disambiguation)